Joseph Arthur Calixte Éthier,  (May 26, 1868 – August 14, 1936) was a Canadian politician.

Born in St-Benoît, Quebec, the son of J. B. Éthier and Julie Boyer, Éthier was educated at Montreal College. A lawyer, he was called to the Quebec Bar in 1895 and was created a King's Counsel in 1906. He was Deputy-prothonotary for the District of Terrebonne from 1888 to 1895 and was a Crown Prosecutor for that District in 1901. He was mayor of Ste. Scholastique, Quebec from 1899 to 1906. He was first elected to Canadian Parliament at the general elections of 1896 for the riding of Two Mountains winning by 17 votes. A Liberal, he was re-elected in every following election including the 1921 election. He did not run in 1925.

Electoral record 

By-election: On election being declared void, 6 August 1902

References
 
 The Canadian Parliament; biographical sketches and photo-engravures of the senators and members of the House of Commons of Canada. Being the tenth Parliament, elected November 3, 1904

1868 births
1936 deaths
Liberal Party of Canada MPs
Mayors of places in Quebec
Members of the House of Commons of Canada from Quebec
People from Laurentides
Canadian King's Counsel